Live at the Fillmore is the first live album by the American progressive/experimental rock band Dredg, released in 2006. The live album contains songs from Dredg's three studio albums, Leitmotif, El Cielo, and Catch Without Arms, as well as the song "Stone by Stone", a b-side from Catch Without Arms. Chi Cheng was a special guest and played with the band.

Track listing 

Dredg albums
Albums recorded at the Fillmore
2006 live albums